Qırmızı-Saqqallar (also, Qırmızısaqqallar) is a village in the municipality of Borsunlu in the Tartar Rayon of Azerbaijan.

References

Populated places in Tartar District